Glenesk railway station served the village of Glenesk, Midothian, Scotland, from 1855 to 1874 on the Dalkeith branch of the Waverley Route.

History 
The station was opened in 1855 by the North British Railway. It was known as Glenesk Junction in some timetables. It was located as a junction on the Waverley Line with the Dalkeith branch. There were no goods facilities, but there were private sidings located to the north of the station which served Glenesk Colliery Railway. The tracks went over the Glenesk Viaduct, which is still open today. The station closed on 1 November 1874, although it was classed as an unadvertised use until 1886.

References

External links 

Disused railway stations in Midlothian
Former North British Railway stations
Railway stations in Great Britain opened in 1855
1855 establishments in Scotland
1874 disestablishments in Scotland
Railway stations in Great Britain closed in 1874
Dalkeith